Uncial 0272 (in the Gregory-Aland numbering), is a Greek uncial manuscript of the New Testament. Paleographically it has been assigned to the 9th century.

Description 
The codex contains a small parts of the Gospel of Luke, on 3 parchment leaves (33 cm by 26 cm). It is written in two columns per page, 25 lines per page, in uncial letters. It is a palimpsest, the upper text contains menaeon in Greek. Formerly it was included together with Uncial 0271 and Uncial 0273 in Uncial 0133 (because of similarities). 

Currently it is dated by the INTF to the 9th century.

Contents 

The codex contains: Gospel of Luke 16:21-17:3(?).19-35(?); 19:15-31(?). 
The text is not always legible.

Text 
The Greek text of this codex is a representative of the Byzantine text-type. Aland placed it in Category V.

Location 
The codex is currently housed at the British Library (Add MS 31919, ff. 21, 98, 101) in London.

See also 

 List of New Testament uncials
 Textual criticism

References 

Greek New Testament uncials
9th-century biblical manuscripts
British Library additional manuscripts